Sękowice  is a village in the administrative district of Gmina Gubin, within Krosno Odrzańskie County, Lubusz Voivodeship, in western Poland, close to the German border.

References

Villages in Krosno Odrzańskie County